St. James's Church is a church in Koper, southwestern Slovenia. It was built in the 14th century in the Venetian Gothic style.

Roman Catholic churches in the Slovene Littoral
Buildings and structures in Koper
14th-century Roman Catholic church buildings in Slovenia
Venetian Gothic architecture
Gothic architecture in Slovenia